The Boston Water and Sewer Commission (BWSC) serves retail customers with water services in Boston, Massachusetts. It purchases water wholesale from the Massachusetts Water Resources Authority (MWRA).

It was created in 1977 taking control of the city operated sewer system and the state operated treatment facilities.

The basic Boston water distribution system opened in 1848, and the wastewater collection system in 1883. In a response to the dangers posed to Boston by severely deteriorated water distribution and wastewater collection systems, BWSC was created in 1977 by an act of the Massachusetts legislature as a public instrument, a corporate separate and apart from the City of Boston. The Enabling Act empowered the BWSC to independently set rates and charges for the water distribution and wastewater collection services it provides and entrusted BWSC to improve and maintain the integrity of its systems.

BWSC purchases water from the Massachusetts Water Resources Authority (MWRA), a wholesale supplier of water and wastewater services. MWRA collect water in the Quabbin Reservoir, connected by a  tunnel to Boston, and enters BWSC distribution system at 27 metered sites. When full, the Quabbin Reservoir holds , making it one of the largest man-made public water supplies in the country.

It has also, in conjunction with the MWRA, eliminated  of combined sewer overflows to Boston Harbor. In 2003, BWSC installed an automated reading device on every meter, that allows it to track daily consumption.

The BWSC is home to the largest solar array in the City of Boston.  In June 2007, the City of Boston became one of thirteen inaugural Solar America Cities under the Solar American Initiative led by the U.S. Department of Energy and launched Solar Boston, a half-million-dollar program to encourage the widespread adoption of solar energy in Boston. Through Solar Boston, the City will:

(a) Develop a strategy for the installation of solar technology throughout Boston including mapping feasible locations, preparing a project-labor agreement, and planning the citywide bulk purchase, financing, and installation of solar technology, (b) Work with local organizations to maximize Boston 's participation in state incentive programs and innovative financing initiatives (c) Create a successor non-profit organization to implement the long-term goals of the partnership, (d) Solar Boston partners include the U.S. Department of Energy, the Massachusetts Technology Collaborative, local utilities and unions, an anonymous foundation, and a broad range of local, regional, and national clean energy stakeholders including the US Department of Energy.

2015 Water and sewer rates 

Table of rates effective January 1, 2015

The typical customer pays just over a penny per gallon:
A multi-unit residence using 600 GPD will be charged $291.20 per 31-day month or approximately $3,428.64 annually. A small commercial property using 4,000 GPD will be charged $2,119.45 per 31-day month or approximately $24,954.81 annually.'

References

External links

Historic American Engineering Record documentation, all filed under Boston, Suffolk County, MA

Companies based in Boston
Water companies of the United States
Water supply and sanitation in Massachusetts
1977 establishments in Massachusetts